Sinatra & Jobim @ 50 is a latin jazz album by John Pizzarelli, released in 2017 with Concord Jazz. It's a tribute to the 1967 album Francis Albert Sinatra & Antônio Carlos Jobim, released fifty years ago at the time of recording. It's also Pizzarelli's first foray into the genre since his 2004 album Bossa Nova.

The album features Jobim's grandson Daniel Jobim on piano and vocals, whose parts were recorded in his native Brazil. Other backing vocals are provided by his wife Jessica Molaskey, and daughter Madeleine Pizzarelli.

The tracks include Antonio's Song, a tribute to Jobim by Michael Franks whom Pizzarelli also cited as a hero of his. Also included are two new tracks written by Pizzarelli and Molaskey.

Reception 

Matt Collar of AllMusic rated it with the best of John Pizzarelli's albums to date, with 4.5 stars. He commented "Sinatra & Jobim at 50 works as both an homage to two of Pizzarelli's biggest influences and a revealing showcase for his ever deepening musical palette," and that "the album was an unexpected delight for fans."

C. Michael Bailey summarised the album for All About Jazz as a "quiet, breezy affair of lilting Brazilian rhythms and melodies played by a crack team of musicians." He commented "singing and guitar playing are of the level we have come to expect of Pizzarelli, who has matured fully into this role of keeper of the flame for this flavor of jazz music."

Will Friedwald of The Wall Street Journal ended his review saying the album "succeed[ed] at maintaining a tricky balance: staying true to the [original] while, at the same time, creating something new and exciting out of music already considered classic.

Christopher Louden wrote for the JazzTimes that "Pizzarelli revisits the Sinatra-Jobim oeuvre with sublimely honorific results."

Track listing

Personnel

Performers 
 John Pizzarelliguitar (acoustic), guitar (electric), primary artist, vocals, vocals (background)
 Daniel Jobimpiano, vocals
 Harry Allensax (tenor)
 Hélio Alvespiano
 Duduka da Fonsecadrums, percussion
 Mike Karndouble bass
 Jessica Molaskeyvocals (background)
 Madeleine Pizzarellivocals (background)

Support 
 John Pizzarelliarranger, producer
 Daniel Jobimarranger, engineer
 Jessica Molaskeycomposer, producer
 Irving Berlincomposer
 Vinícius de Moraescomposer
 Aloysio de Oliveiracomposer
 George Forrestcomposer
 Michael Frankscomposer
 Ray Gilbertcomposer
 Norman Gimbelcomposer
 Antônio Carlos Jobimcomposer
 Newton Mendonçacomposer
 Manuel Mindlin Lafercomposer
 Gene Leescomposer
 Cole Portercomposer
 Robert Wrightcomposer
 Jacob Blickenstaffphotography
 Joseph McCarthypackage design
 Bill Mossengineer, mastering, mixing

Notes 
 Songs are listed in the language as they appear in the album's liner notes, but link to their Portuguese titles on Wikipedia where appropriate.
 Some reviewers reference the album with the word "at" (see References) but the album cover and official sites use an ampersand.

References

External links 
 

2017 albums
John Pizzarelli albums
Latin jazz albums by American artists
Concord Records albums
Antônio Carlos Jobim tribute albums
Collaborative albums